Getting Heavier is Racer X's fifth and final studio album, and their final album before their hiatus.

Track listing

Personnel 

Jeff Martin – vocals
Paul Gilbert – guitars
John Alderete – bass
Scott Travis – drums

External links 
 Official Racer X website

Racer X (band) albums
2002 albums